Eutatus is an extinct genus of large armadillos of the family Chlamyphoridae. Based on carbon isotope ratios, it is thought to have been an herbivore that fed on grasses.

Taxonomy 
Eutatus was named by Gervais (1867). The type species is E. seguini. It was assigned to Dasypodidae by Carroll (1988).

Fossil distribution 
The fossil remains are confined to Argentina and have been found in the Santacrucian Santa Cruz Formation, Ensenadan Miramar Formation, and the Lujanian Luján Formation.

Gallery

References 

Armadillos
Prehistoric placental genera
Prehistoric cingulates
Pleistocene xenarthrans
Burdigalian first appearances
Pleistocene genus extinctions
Pleistocene mammals of South America
Santacrucian
Ensenadan
Lujanian
Neogene Argentina
Fossils of Argentina
Fossil taxa described in 1867